Jensen Guy Weir (born 31 January 2002) is an English professional footballer who plays for Morecambe, on loan from Brighton & Hove Albion, as a midfielder.

Early and personal life
Born in Warrington, his father is former Scotland international footballer David Weir.

Club career

Wigan Athletic 

Weir made his senior debut for Wigan Athletic on 7 November 2017, in an EFL Trophy game against Accrington Stanley, becoming the club's youngest ever player, at the age of 15 years and 280 days. He made his league debut in a Championship game at Birmingham City on 27 April 2019, coming on as a second half substitute for Nick Powell.

Brighton & Hove Albion 
On 10 July 2020, it was reported that Weir was going to be sold to Premier League side Brighton & Hove Albion for £500,000 plus add-ons in order to help alleviate Wigan's financial problems. On 23 July 2020, Weir joined Brighton on a three-year deal. He was named in a matchday squad for the first time for the senior side on 3 February 2021, remaining an unused substitute in a 1–0 away win over Liverpool, Brighton's first league win at Anfield since 1982.

Cambridge United (loan)
On 13 July 2021, Weir joined newly promoted League One side Cambridge United on a season-long loan deal. He made his debut on 10 August, starting in the EFL Cup first round tie at home against Swindon Town where Cambridge won 3–1 on penalties after a goalless draw in the 90 minutes of play. Four days later Weir made his league debut for The U's starting and playing 61 minutes before being replaced by Adam May in the 2–1 away loss at Accrington Stanley. He scored his first senior goal on 30 October, scoring the only goal of the game in a 1–0 home victory over AFC Wimbledon.
Weir made his final appearance for the U's on 18 December, in a 1–0 home loss against Rotherham after a knee injury kept him on the sidelines for the rest of the season.

Morecambe (loan) 
On 25 July 2022, Weir returned to League One on a season-long loan deal to Morecambe. He was sent off after picking up two yellow cards on his Shrimps home debut and second appearance in the eventual penalty shootout win over Stoke City of the Championship in the EFL Cup on 9 August.

International career
Weir has played for Scotland at under-16 and under-17 level, captaining the under-16 team. In October 2018 he was called up by England under-17s, and made his debut during the 3–0 victory over Russia U17s. In April 2019, Weir was included in the England squad for the 2019 UEFA European Under-17 Championship.

Weir made his U18 debut during the 3–2 victory over Australia at Leicester Road on 6 September 2019.

On 6 September 2021, Weir made a goalscoring debut for the England U20s during a 6–1 victory over Romania U20s at St. George's Park.

Career statistics

See also
List of sportspeople who competed for more than one nation

References

2002 births
Living people
Footballers from Warrington
English footballers
Scottish footballers
Association football midfielders
England youth international footballers
Scotland youth international footballers
English people of Scottish descent
Wigan Athletic F.C. players
Brighton & Hove Albion F.C. players
Cambridge United F.C. players
Morecambe F.C. players
English Football League players